Fabianki  is a village in Włocławek County, Kuyavian-Pomeranian Voivodeship, in north-central Poland. It is the seat of the gmina (administrative district) called Gmina Fabianki.

The village has a population of 660.

History 
The first mention of the settlement Dried came from year 1305. The name derived from the Prussian name Suse. After the site for almost chel Minsk, which accounts for the years 1305 - 1310 the town received the name of the German Rosenberg. In the years 1521 - 1946 Drought was a city district. Despite the devastation of war, after World War II remained Dried legible nawarstwiający historically rzenny criminal system. The old town created in the fourteenth century, the circular shape - resulting from the terrain, the market square in the middle (formerly the town hall and benches merchant) still attracts tourists preserved architectural detail. Architecturally distinctive feature of the city is located in the eastern part of the old town church from the late fourteenth and seventeenth centuries of the Holy. Anthony, in which there are historic Renaissance altars. In the area of Old Town are currently rebuilding. Blue awem market is surrounded by houses, with the sequence of service and trade, nawiązującymi to the historical buildings of the city. 

Wealth attracts visitors are still here today, virgin forests and rich in fish lakes. Unique qualities of flora and fauna hidden Lake District Landscape Park Iławskiego, especially Nature reserves' Gaudy Lake Nature Reserve "and" Reserve Czerwica "where the dead sea eagle, nest herons and cormorants. Suska Earth also abounds in game animals and is known in the circles hunting the rich hunting grounds. newcomers here can commune with nature during walks, horseback rides, biking or swimming the boat.

Old oak and lime avenues leading through varied post-glacial landscape - lead to a single tourist complexes, park - the palace for a meeting with nature and interesting history surrounding Drought.

Kamieniec - a former dorodziny Finckenstein - the largest palace in Prussia the ancient forest surrounding em. The ruins of the late Baroque building conceals a lot of interesting history, including an episode of stay in the palace of Emperor Napoleon III and the Countess Marie Walewska in 1807 and other personalities associated with the history of Polish and German, for example, King Augustus II Mocneg about whether Hitler.

Gostyczyn - moving hiking trail in the river Liwy Iława Lake District Landscape Park, a tourist meets a charming nook - hunting manor reminiscent Napoleonic times. Gostyczyn n ależał in the past for family-zu Dohna Schlobiten and Finckenstein. Manor house surrounded by oak trees stretching - natural monuments - passing in the alley leading into the virgin forests in these parts.

References

Fabianki